Frea plurifasciculata is a species of  longhorn beetle in the family Cerambycidae located in Sub-Saharan Africa, specifically observed in Cameroon. It was described by Stephan von Breuning in 1970.

References

plurifasciculata
Beetles described in 1970